Masaki Takeuchi (born 1 May 1995), is a Japanese Muay Thai fighter and kickboxer, currently fighting in the featherweight division of Krush.

Combat Press ranked him as a top ten super flyweight kickboxer in the world between July 2021 and June 2022, peaking at #8.

Championships and accomplishments
World Professional Muaythai Federation
 2013 WPMF Japan Bantamweight Champion 
 2015 WPMF Japan Bantamweight Champion 

J-NETWORK
 2016 J-NETWORK Bantamweight Champion 

Martial Arts Japan Kickboxing Federation
 2016 MAJKF Super Bantamweight Champion 

Bigbang
 2019 Bigbang Featherweight Champion 

Battle of MuayThai
 2021 BOM Featherweight Champion

Fight record

|-  style="background:#cfc;"
| 2022-07-30 ||Win||align=left| Kazuma Kubo|| Krush 139 || Tokyo, Japan || Decision (Unanimous) || 3 ||3:00
|-  style="background:#fbb;"
| 2022-04-30 || Loss||align=left| Riku Morisaka|| Krush 136 || Tokyo, Japan || Decision (Majority) || 3 ||3:00
|-  style="background:#fbb;
| 2022-01-23|| Loss ||align=left| Ryoga Hirano || RISE 154 || Tokyo, Japan || Decision (Unanimous) || 3 || 3:00  
|-  style="text-align:center; background:#cfc;"
| 2021-09-26|| Win|| align=left| Takanobu Sano ||  Battle of MuayThai – ouroboros 2021 – || Tokyo, Japan || Ext. R Decision (Unanimous) || 4 || 3:00
|-
! style=background:white colspan=9 |
|-  style="background:#fbb;"
| 2021-07-28|| Loss||align=left| Masahide Kudo || RISE 151 || Tokyo, Japan || TKO (3 Knockdowns/Punches)  || 1 ||1:43
|-
! style=background:white colspan=9 |
|-  style="background:#cfc;"
| 2021-01-30|| Win ||align=left| Keisuke Monguchi || RISE 145 || Tokyo, Japan || Decision (Unanimous) || 3 || 3:00
|-  style="background:#cfc;"
| 2020-11-14|| Win ||align=left| Shuto Miyazaki || RISE 143 || Tokyo, Japan || Decision (Unanimous) || 3 || 3:00
|-  style="background:#cfc;"
| 2020-02-09|| Win ||align=left| Jae Jin Lee || The Battle Of Muay Thai Season 2 vol.7 Part 2 || Yokohama, Japan || Decision (Majority) || 3 || 3:00
|-  style="background:#cfc;"
| 2019-12-29|| Win ||align=left| Yuki Miyazaki || Bigbang 37 || Tokyo, Japan ||  Decision (Unanimous) || 3 || 3:00
|-
! style=background:white colspan=9 |
|-  style="background:#cfc;"
| 2019-11-03|| Win ||align=left| Kenichi Takeuchi || Bigbang Isehara 2019 || Tokyo, Japan || Decision (Split) || 3 || 3:00
|-  style="background:#fbb;"
| 2019-08-11|| Loss ||align=left| Shota Oiwa || Shonan Fight Challenge || Shonan, Japan ||  Decision (Unanimous) || 3 || 3:00
|-  style="background:#fbb;"
| 2019-06-07|| Loss ||align=left| Daiki Toita || Bigbang 36 || Tokyo, Japan ||  Decision (Unanimous) || 3 || 3:00
|-  style="background:#fbb;"
| 2019-02-03|| Loss ||align=left| Rasta || RISE 130 || Tokyo, Japan || Decision (Unanimous) || 3 || 3:00
|-  style="background:#cfc;"
| 2019-01-16|| Win ||align=left| Yugo Kato || ROAD TO KNOCK OUT Vol. 3 || Tokyo, Japan || TKO (Doctor Stoppage) || 2 || 1:31
|-  style="background:#cfc;"
| 2018-12-09|| Win ||align=left| Akihiko || The Battle of Muay Thai 20 || Yokohama, Japan || Decision (Unanimous) || 3 || 3:00
|-  style="background:#fbb;"
| 2018-10-21|| Loss ||align=left| KOUMA || M-ONE 2018 FINAL || Tokyo, Japan ||  TKO (Doctor Stoppage) || 2 || 1:56
|-
! style=background:white colspan=9 |
|-  style="background:#cfc;"
| 2018-07-01|| Win ||align=left| Taisei Umei || The Battle of Muay Thai 18 || Yokohama, Japan || Decision (Unanimous) || 3 || 3:00
|-  style="background:#fbb;"
| 2018-04-14|| Loss ||align=left| Masahiko Suzuki || KNOCK OUT Sakura Burst || Kanagawa, Japan || TKO (3 Knockdowns) || 2 || 1:14
|-  style="background:#cfc;"
| 2017-12-17|| Win ||align=left| Shohei Mortishita || BOM 16 - The Battle Of Muay Thai 16 Part.2  || Yokohama, Japan || Decision (Unanimous) || 3 || 3:00
|-  style="background:#cfc;"
| 2017-08-06|| Win ||align=left| Norihisa Isencho || BOM 15 - The Battle Of Muay Thai 15 -  || Tokyo, Japan || KO (Left Hook) || 3 || 3:00
|-  style="background:#cfc;"
| 2017-04-16|| Win ||align=left| Daihachi Furuoka || SNKA TITANS NEOS 21 || Tokyo, Japan || Decision (Unanimous) || 3 || 3:00
|-  style="background:#cfc;"
| 2016-12-04|| Win ||align=left| Ryo Takahashi || BOM 13 - The Battle Of Muay Thai 13 -  || Yokohama, Japan || Decision (Majority) || 3 || 3:00
|-  style="background:#cfc;"
| 2016-04-30|| Win ||align=left| Takashi Ohno || MAJKF Festival of Martial Arts ～FIGHT FOR PEACE 7～ || Tokyo, Japan || Decision (Majority) || 3 ||3:00
|-
! style=background:white colspan=9 |
|-  style="background:#cfc;"
| 2016-02-28|| Win ||align=left| Tsuyoshi Ono || J-NETWORK - J-KICK 2016～Honor the fighting spirits～1st || Tokyo, Japan || Decision (Majority) || 5 ||3:00
|-
! style=background:white colspan=9 |
|-  style="background:#fbb;"
| 2015-09-19|| Loss ||align=left| Takaaki Hayashi || GRACHAN 19×BOM IX.5 || Tokyo, Japan || KO (Right Elbow) || 3 || 0:44 
|-
! style=background:white colspan=9 |
|-  style="background:#fbb;"
| 2015-07-19|| Loss ||align=left| Hunter Vanhoose || - The Battle Of Muay Thai IX -  || Yokohama, Japan || Decision (Unanimous) || 5 || 3:00
|-  style="background:#cfc;"
| 2015-06-21|| Win ||align=left| Tsuyoshi Ono || J-NETWORK - J-FIGHT＆J-GIRLS 2015 3rd || Tokyo, Japan || Decision (Split) || 3 ||3:00
|-  style="background:#CCFFCC;"
| 2015-04-29|| Win ||align=left| Tatsuya Hibata || The Battle of Muaythai VIII || Tokyo, Japan || TKO (Referee Stoppage) || 4 || 3:00 
|-
! style=background:white colspan=9 |
|-  style="background:#fbb;"
| 2014-08-10|| Loss ||align=left| Takashi Ohno || MAJKF KICK GUTS 2014 || Tokyo, Japan || KO (Flying Knee) || 5 ||2:28
|-
! style=background:white colspan=9 |
|-  style="background:#fbb;"
| 2014-06-15|| Loss ||align=left| Kunihiro || M-FIGHT SUK WEERASAKRECK VI || Tokyo, Japan || TKO (Right Hook) || 3 ||1:38
|-  style="background:#cfc;"
| 2014-04-13|| Win ||align=left| Tinree Revival || M-FIGHT - The Battle Of Muay Thai IV -  || Tokyo, Japan || Decision (Unanimous) || 5 || 3:00
|-  style="background:#fbb;"
| 2014-02-23|| Loss ||align=left| Kenta || J-NETWORK - J-FIGHT in SHINJUKU ～vol.36～ || Tokyo, Japan || Decision (Unanimous) || 3 ||3:00
|-  style="background:#CCFFCC;"
| 2013-12-01|| Win ||align=left| Yosuke Innami || M-FIGHT The Battle of Muaythai III || Yokohama, Japan || TKO (Doctor Stoppage) || 3 || 0:27 
|-
! style=background:white colspan=9 |
|-  style="background:#cfc;"
| 2013-10-20|| Win ||align=left| Kyohei Chigira || J-NETWORK - J-FIGHT in SHINJUKU ～vol.33～NIGHT || Tokyo, Japan || Decision (Unanimous) || 3 ||3:00
|-  bgcolor="#fbb"
| 2013-08-12|| Loss||align=left|  || Queen's Cup || Bangkok, Thailand || Decision  || 5 || 3:00
|-  style="background:#fbb;"
| 2013-07-21|| Loss ||align=left| Takuma Ito || Muay Lok 2013 2nd  || Tokyo, Japan || Decision (Unanimous)  || 3 || 3:00
|-  style="background:#cfc;"
| 2013-06-09|| Win ||align=left| David Chibana || TNK1 feat.REBELS || Tokyo, Japan || Decision (Unanimous) || 3 || 3:00
|-  style="background:#cfc;"
| 2013-04-28|| Win ||align=left| Yosuke Innami|| Muay Lok 2013 1st  || Tokyo, Japan || Decision (Majority) || 3 || 3:00
|-  style="background:#fbb;"
| 2013-01-27|| Loss ||align=left| Taisuke Degai || REBELS 14  || Tokyo, Japan || Decision (Unanimous)  || 3 || 3:00
|-  style="background:#c5d2ea;"
| 2012-12-02|| Draw ||align=left| Ryuji Horio || Bigbang 11  || Tokyo, Japan || Decision (Split)  || 3 || 3:00
|-  style="background:#c5d2ea;"
| 2012-10-28|| Draw ||align=left| Masayoshi Kunimoto || REBELS 13  || Tokyo, Japan || Decision (Majority)  || 3 || 3:00
|-  style="background:#CCFFCC;"
| 2012-09-09|| Win ||align=left| Shohei Suzuki || M-1 Muay Thai Challenge Suk Yod Muaythai vol.3 Part 1	 || Tokyo, Japan || TKO  || 2 || 2:51 
|-
! style=background:white colspan=9 |
|-  style="background:#cfc;"
| 2012-06-24|| Win ||align=left| Ryosuke Makino|| M-1 Muay Thai Challenge Suk Yod Muaythai vol.2 Part 1  || Tokyo, Japan || Decision (Split) || 3 || 3:00
|-  style="background:#cfc;"
| 2012-03-04|| Win ||align=left| Shunking || Shuken V  || Tokyo, Japan || KO (Right Cross) || 1 || 2:35
|-
| colspan=9 | Legend:    

|-  style="background:#fbb;"
| 2011-08-27|| Loss ||align=left| Shuto Miyazaki || K-1 Koshien East Japan A-Block Tournament, Final  || Tokyo, Japan || Decision (Majority) || 1 ||
|-  style="background:#cfc;"
| 2011-08-27|| Win ||align=left| Joichiro Shimo || K-1 Koshien East Japan A-Block Tournament, Semi Finals  || Tokyo, Japan || TKO || 1 ||
|-  style="background:#cfc;"
| 2011-08-27|| Win ||align=left| Atsushi Yamada || K-1 Koshien East Japan A-Block Tournament, Quarter Finals  || Tokyo, Japan || Decision (Split) || 1 ||
|-  style="background:#cfc;"
| 2011-08-27|| Win ||align=left| Takumi Jitsukawa || K-1 Koshien East Japan A-Block Tournament, 1/8 Finals  || Tokyo, Japan || TKO ||  || 
|-
| colspan=9 | Legend:

See also
 List of male kickboxers

References

External links

1995 births
Living people
Japanese male kickboxers
Sportspeople from Kanagawa Prefecture